Bianconi is an Italian surname. Notable people with the surname include:

Carlo Bianconi (1732–1802), Italian painter, sculptor and architect
Charles Bianconi (1786–1875), Irish businessman
Diego Bianconi (born 1957), Swiss painter
Franca Bianconi (born 1962), Italian figure skater and coach
Ginestra Bianconi, Italian network scientist
Giovanni Giuseppe Bianconi (1809–1878), Italian zoologist, herpetologist, botanist and geologist
Giovanni Ludovico Bianconi (1717–1781), Italian doctor and antiquarian
Miguel Bianconi (born 1992), Brazilian footballer
Niko Bianconi (born 1991), Italian footballer 
Philippe Bianconi (born 1960), French classical pianist
Roberta Bianconi (born 1989), Italian water polo player

Italian-language surnames